Anıtkabir is the mausoleum of Mustafa Kemal Atatürk, the leader of the Turkish War of Independence and the founder and the first President of the Republic of Turkey. It is located in Ankara and was designed by architects Professor Emin Onat and Assistant Professor Ahmet Orhan Arda, whose proposal beat 48 other entries from several countries in a competition held by the Turkish Government in 1941 for a  monument for Atatürk.

The site is also the final resting place of İsmet İnönü, the second President of Turkey, who was interred there after he died in 1973. His tomb faces the Atatürk Mausoleum, on the opposite side of the Ceremonial Ground.

The mausoleum was depicted on various Turkish banknotes during 1966–1987 and 1997–2009 and was included in the Turkish Chamber of Civil Engineers list of the fifty civil engineering feats in Turkey, a list of remarkable engineering projects realized in the first 50 years of the chamber.

Construction 

The site chosen for Anıtkabir was known as Rasattepe (Observation Hill), which, at the time of the architectural competition for Anıtkabir, was a central location in Ankara and could be seen by all parts of the city. Archeological excavations unearthed artifacts belonging to the Phrygian civilization, which were carefully excavated and put on display in the Museum of Anatolian Civilizations, also in Ankara.

The construction of Anıtkabir, which took nine years and spanned four stages, commenced on 9 October 1944 with the ceremony of laying the foundation stone.

The first stage of the construction, comprising the preparatory excavation and the construction of the retaining wall of the Lions Road, started on 9 October 1944 and was completed in 1945. The second stage of the construction, comprising the mausoleum and the auxiliary buildings surrounding the ceremonial ground, started on 29 September 1945, and was completed on 8 August 1950. At this stage, due to problems related to the mausoleum's masonry and concrete structure foundations, some revisions had to be made. At the end of 1947, the excavation and insulation of the mausoleum foundation was completed and steel reinforcements for the new 11 m. (36.1 ft) high concrete foundation, capable of resisting any kind of settlement of the ground, had come to near completion. The Entrance towers, most parts of the road network, the orchard installations, the plantation works and main parts of the irrigation system were also completed at this stage.

The third stage of the construction was the building of the roads leading to the mausoleum, The Lions Road, and the ceremonial ground; the mausoleum's upper-level stone pavement, the grand stairs, placement of the grand tombstone, and the installation of electricity, plumbing and heating systems.

The fourth and last stage of construction was the laying of the Hall of Honour pavement, vaults under the side linings, and Hall of Honour perimeter stone profiles and fringe decorations, which was completed on 1 September 1953.

Revision of original plans 
The Anıtkabir project originally had a vaulted ceiling above the mausoleum carried by the perimeter columns. After studying the subject, the architects concluded that it was possible to cover the ceiling with a reinforced concrete slab instead of a stone vault. This change reduced the weight of the ceiling and also eliminated certain constructional risks.

Surface reliefs and stones 
All stones and marbles were brought in from various parts of Turkey. Easily processed porous travertine is used on external cladding of the concrete surfaces and marble is used for the inside surfaces of the Hall of Honour.

White travertine used for the sculpture groups, lions figures and the mausoleum columns was brought from Kayseri and the travertine used inside the towers was brought from Polatlı and Malıköy. The red and black travertine used for paving the ceremonial ground and floors of the towers came from Kayseri. Yellow travertine brought from Çankırı was used for building the Victory Reliefs, the Hall of Honour's external walls, and perimeter columns of the ceremonial ground. The red, black and cream colour marble that was used on the floor of the Hall of Honour were brought from Hatay, Adana and Çanakkale, and for the internal walls, tiger-patterned marble from Afyon and green marble from Bilecik was used. The sarcophagus, a monolithic tomb stone weighing 40 tons, was brought from Adana and the white marble covering the sides of the sarcophagus were also from Afyon.

Layout 

There are four main parts to Anıtkabir: the Road of Lions, the Ceremonial Plaza, the Hall of Honor (location of Atatürk's tomb) and the Peace Park that surrounds the monument.

Road of Lions 
The approach to the monument is a -long pedestrian walkway that is lined on both sides by twelve pairs of lions carved in a style like the Hittite archaeological finds. The lions represent 24 Oghuz Turkic Tribes and are shown seated to simultaneously represent both power and peace. A five centimeter gap separates the paving stones on the Road of Lions to ensure that visitors take their time and observe respectful behavior on their way to Atatürk's tomb.

Ceremonial Plaza 
The Ceremonial Plaza is situated at the end of the Lions Road. The floor is decorated with 373 rug and kilim (Turkish carpet) patterns, and is made of travertine in various colors.

Hall of Honor 

The Hall of Honor is the iconic symbol of Anıtkabir and the location of Atatürk's tomb.

Atatürk's tomb is situated right under the symbolic 40-ton sarcophagus in the ground floor of The Hall of Honor, and Atatürk's body is buried below this in a special Tomb Room in the basement level. The room has an octagonal plan in Seljuk and Ottoman architectural styles, and its pyramidal ceiling is inlaid with gold mosaics.

Peace Park 
The park that surrounds the monument is called a Peace Park in honor of Atatürk's famous expression "Peace at home, peace in the world." It contains around 50,000 decorative trees, flowers and shrubs in 104 varieties, donated from around 25 countries.

Towers, statues, museum 
Within the Anıtkabir site there are ten towers situated in a symmetrical arrangement. These symbolize the ideals that influenced the Turkish nation and the creation of the Republic of Turkey. The towers are similar in terms of planning and structure: they are rectangular, close to a square, with pyramidal roofs. Bronze arrowheads are placed on the top of the roofs, like in traditional Turkish nomad tents. Inside the towers, geometric ornamentation inspired by traditional Turkish carpet (kilim) patterns and motifs, can be found on the towers' ceilings in fresco technique. There are also inscriptions of quotes by Atatürk that correspond to the theme of that tower.

Independence Tower 
The relief inside the Independence Tower shows a young man standing straight and holding a sword with both hands while an eagle is perching on a rock beside him. The eagle represents power and independence in mythology and in Seljuk art, and the young man with the sword represents the Turkish nation defending its independence.

Female statue group 
In front of the Independence Tower, there is a statue group of three women in Turkish national costumes. The two women at the sides are holding a large wreath reaching to the ground. This wreath, made up of grain sheaves, represents the abundant country. The woman on the left with a cup in her stretched-out hand is asking for God's compassion. The woman in the middle, covering her face with her hand, is crying. This group represents the pride of Turkish women, and their solemnity and determination even in grief and hardship.

Freedom Tower 
The relief inside the Freedom Tower shows a figure of an angel holding a sheet of paper and a rearing horse next to it. The angel figure symbolizes the holiness of freedom and the sheet of paper symbolizes the Turkish Declaration of Freedom. The horse figure is a symbol of both freedom and independence.

Male statue group 
In front of the Freedom Tower there is a statue group made up of three men. The man at the right with a helmet and coat represents a Turkish soldier; on the left with a book in his hand is a Turkish youth and intellectual; behind both of these, in village clothing, is a Turkish peasant. The serious facial expressions of all three statues represent the solemnity and willpower of the Turkish people.

Mehmetçik Tower 
The Mehmetçik Tower is situated on the right-hand side of the end of the Lion's Road. The relief on the exterior facade depicts a mehmetçik (Turkish foot soldier) leaving home for the front. In this composition, a sad but proud mother holding her hand on the shoulder of her son sends him to the war for the country. There is a bookstore and a gift shop in this tower for visitors interested in buying articles about Anıtkabir and Atatürk.

Victory Tower 
The dates of the nation's most important three victories and Atatürk's words about these victories are inscribed on the walls of this tower. Inside the tower, the gun carriage, which carried Atatürk's coffin from Dolmabahçe Palace to Sarayburnu and handed over to the Navy on 19 November 1938 is on display.

Peace Tower 
A relief composition expressing Atatürk's principle of Peace at home, peace in the world is inscribed inside the tower walls. In this relief, peasants and a soldier figure protecting them by holding out his sword are depicted. This soldier symbolizes the Turkish Army, the strong and genuine keeper of the peace, allowing people to live their daily lives in peace secured by the Turkish Army.

23 April Tower 

On the inside walls of this tower is a relief depicting the opening of the Turkish Grand National Assembly on 23 April 1920. The woman standing in this relief is holding a paper in her hand with an inscription of the date. The key in her other hand symbolizes the opening of the Assembly.

Atatürk's 1936 Cadillac Series 80 car, used between 1936 and 1938, is on display in this tower.

Tower of Reforms 
This tower is the extension of the museum and Atatürk's garments are exhibited here. The relief inside the tower wall shows a weak hand holding the torch about to extinguish, symbolizing the downfall of the Ottoman Empire. Another, strong hand raising a radiating torch to the skies symbolizes the reforms with which the new Turkish Republic and Atatürk raised the Turkish Nation to the level of contemporary civilization.

Misak-ı Millî (National Pact) Tower 
The tower is at the entry to the museum (see below) and the relief inside this tower symbolizes the binding in unity. The relief shows four hands joining on a sword hilt. This composition symbolizes the nation's common oath to save the Turkish Country.

Anıtkabir Atatürk Museum 
Anıtkabir Atatürk Museum opened on 21 June 1960. Atatürk's personal items, his wardrobe, and some of the gifts presented to him are on display in this museum. Atatürk's medals, decorations and some personal items donated to the museum by his adopted children are also exhibited in the museum.

Architectural properties 
The period of Turkish architecture between 1940 and 1950 has been classified by architectural historians as the Second National Architecture Movement. This period is characterized mostly by monumental, symmetrical, cut-stone clad buildings, with great emphasis given to detailing and workmanship in construction. Anıtkabir contains the same characteristics of this period, and is considered by many to be the ultimate monument of the era. In addition, Anıtkabir features Seljuq and Ottoman architectural and ornamentation features. For example, the eaves of the towers and the Hall of Honour are all Seljuq-style sawtooth ornamentation.

Visitors 

On 10 November 2007, the 69th anniversary of Atatürk's death, 546,620 people, of whom 2,420 were foreigners, visited Anıtkabir, setting an all-time high record of daily visitors. In the first 11 months of 2007, Anıtkabir received more than 11 million visitors, surpassing the total number of visitors for any previous whole year. In 2006, a total of 8,150,000 people and in 2005, a total of 3,800,000 people visited Anıtkabir.

On 10 November 2013, 1,089,615 people visited Anıtkabir which is the new all-time record. On 29 October 2013 which is the anniversary of the foundation of the Republic of Turkey, 438,451 people visited Anıtkabir. On 10 November 2012, the recorded number of visitors was announced as 413,568 people.

List of burials

Gallery

See also 
 Law on Crimes Committed Against Atatürk
 Mustafa Kemal Atatürk's cult of personality
 Turkish War of Independence
 Atatürk monuments and memorials

References

External links 

 Official website of Anıtkabir 
 360° virtual tour of Anıtkabir
 
 Anıtkabir visitors book  
 Beyond Anıtkabir: The Construction and Maintenance of National Memory in the Funerary Architecture for Mustafa Kemal Atatürk
 Anıtkabir in 3D on its real place

Atatürk museums
Biographical museums in Turkey
Buildings and structures completed in 1953
Buildings and structures in Ankara
Çankaya, Ankara
Landmarks in Turkey
Mausoleums in Turkey
Monuments and memorials to Mustafa Kemal Atatürk in Turkey
Museums in Ankara
National museums in Turkey
National squares
Tourist attractions in Ankara
Stripped Classical architecture